Strintzios is a village of the Agia municipality. The 2011 census recorded no permanent residents in the village. In the census of 2001 Strintzios was not recorded as a separate settlement. Strintzios is a part of the community of Palaiopyrgos.

Geography
Strintzios is a coastal village located near the delta of the river Pineios.

See also
 List of settlements in the Larissa regional unit

References

Populated places in Larissa (regional unit)